The 1933 New Mexico Lobos football team represented the University of New Mexico as a member of the Border Conference during the 1933 college football season. In their third and final season under head coach Chuck Riley, the Lobos compiled an overall record of 3–4–1 record with a mark of 2–2 against conference opponents, finished fourth in the Border Conference, and were outscored by a total of 108 to 92. Jack Walton was the team captain.

In January 1934, the university's board of regents announced that Riley's contract as head football coach would not be renewed.

Schedule

References

New Mexico
New Mexico Lobos football seasons
New Mexico Lobos football